It is a method for detecting any clinically important antibodies in patient serum.   Whereas gel agglutination is based on size exclusion of agglutinated red cells in an inert matrix, red cell affinity column technology (ReACT) is based on affinity adherence of red cells in an immunologically active matrix.

In ReACT, antibody-sensitized red cells bind to ligands attached to an agarose matrix. The main ligand is Protein G (prepared from Group C or G Streptococcus or by recombinant technology), which has high affinity for all four IgG subclasses. Another ReACT ligand is Protein A (from Group A Staphlococcus), which binds to IgG 1, 2, and 4.

Blood